"God Gave Me You" is a song written and originally recorded by American contemporary Christian music singer Dave Barnes. It was released in January 2010 as the lead single from the album, What We Want, What We Get.

History
Barnes wrote the song after the title came to him while he was walking through London, England. He told Country Weekly that "the lyrics just flowed together with the melody" when he wrote it. Barnes also said that he was inspired by his wife, Annie, who supported him "through all the ups and downs of an artist's career." After releasing it, he said that he received mail from fans who said that the song's message "saved marriages or became a theme for a couple's relationship."

Music video
Barnes' version features a music video directed by Joey Boukadakis.

Chart positions

Blake Shelton version

In 2011, American country music singer Blake Shelton recorded the song on his 2011 album Red River Blue. His rendition was released in July 2011 as the album's second single. Shelton heard Barnes' version of the song on a contemporary Christian station, and said that it had inspired him to propose to then-girlfriend Miranda Lambert (now ex-wife); the music video included footage from Lambert the night before their wedding. On November 30, the song was nominated for the Grammy Award for Best Country Song.

Critical reception
Jessica Phillips of Country Weekly called the song "the romantic zenith of the album". Rolling Stone reviewer Will Hermes said that it was a "spirited cover" that "makes the most of its big, sculpted hooks". Jonathan Keefe of Slant Magazine was less favorable, saying in his review of the album, "His weakness for overwrought, schmaltzy pop ballads rears its head on second single 'God Gave Me You,' which sounds like something Bryan Adams or Foreigner would have recorded 20 years ago." Similarly, Melissa Mairz of Entertainment Weekly thought that it was a "schmaltzy power ballad". Engine 145 writer Karlie Justus gave it a thumbs-down, with her review saying that Shelton's "honest, vibrant vocal performance is nearly canceled out by a tinny instrumental mix of anonymous background vocals and a looping drum beat".

Music video
The music video was directed by Trey Fanjoy and premiered in September 2011. It features Blake and his band performing the song in a dark tunnel, with a video screen playing in the background. It also shows 3 different scenarios that end in happiness and joy: a waitress returning home to her daughter after a tough and rainy work day, a student (portrayed by Stirling Everly, the grandson of Don Everly of The Everly Brothers) on his first day of high school meeting a female classmate in class for the first time, and an EMT saving a man’s life after an accident.

Before the song begins and at the end of the video, footage of Blake’s then-fiance Miranda Lambert is shown, and she goes on to say how proud she is to be his wife and best friend. Blake said at the time, “That footage made the video. If that footage wasn’t there, there would be no video.”

Due to Blake & Miranda’s divorce in 2015, CMT took the video out of rotation (which it also did with his “Doin’ What She Likes” video, which features a phone conversation between Blake & Miranda), and GAC starts the video when the song starts, and ends it right before Miranda’s final words to Blake.

Chart performance
"God Gave Me You" debuted at number 56 on the U.S. Billboard Hot Country Songs chart for the week of July 23, 2011, and it debuted at number 65 on the U.S. Billboard Hot 100 chart for the week of July 11, 2011. On the chart dated October 29, 2011, "God Gave Me You" became Shelton's fifth consecutive Number One single and his tenth overall.  It has sold 2,514,000 copies in the United States as of November 2014.

Weekly charts

Year-end charts

Decade-end charts

Certifications

References

2010 singles
2011 singles
2010 songs
2010s ballads
Dave Barnes songs
Blake Shelton songs
Song recordings produced by Scott Hendricks
Music videos directed by Trey Fanjoy
Country ballads
Warner Records Nashville singles
Songs written by Dave Barnes
Razor & Tie singles